Cartagogena filtrata is a species of moth of the family Tortricidae. It is found in Costa Rica.

The wingspan is about 24 mm. The forewings are monochrome, whitish and slightly tinged with grey and suffused with ochreous in the apex area. There are a few blackish scales scattered in the distal half of the wing. The hindwings are slightly paler than the forewings.

References

Moths described in 1992
Cochylini